El Concierto Sinfónico is the second live album by the Puerto Rican rock band Fiel a la Vega and their fourth album overall. The album was recorded with the Puerto Rico Symphony Orchestra at the Luis A. Ferré Performing Arts Center in Santurce, Puerto Rico, during the concerts the band held from March 26 to 28, 2001. It was released later that year.

Like their previous live album, El Concierto Acústico, the album includes the band's previous hits as well as cover versions of some of the artists who influenced them like Rubén Blades and El Gran Combo.

Track listing
 "Obertura"
 "Bla, Bla, Bla"
 "Siembra" (from R. Blades)
 "Boquerón / Cositas Así"
 "Las Manos Del Campo"
 "El Panal"
 El Gran Combo Medley
 "La Maza"
 "Granos de Sal"
 "¿CVND?"
 "Septiembre Rio Pideras"
 "Voces de Sol"
 "Que Vivan los Estudiantes"
 "Los Superhéroes"

Personnel
 Tito Auger - lead vocals, rhythm guitar
 Ricky Laureano - lead guitar, vocals
 Jorge Arraiza - bass guitar
 Pedro Arraiza - drums
 Papo Román - percussion

Fiel a la Vega albums
2001 live albums